C/2015 V2 (Johnson) is a hyperbolic comet discovered on 3 November 2015 by Jess Johnson (Catalina Sky Survey) at an apparent magnitude of 17.1 using a  Schmidt–Cassegrain telescope. Its incoming orbit had a Semimajor Axis of 59,200 AU (0.94 light years), but will have a hyperbolic orbit after leaving the solar system, with an eccentricity of 1.0009. The comet was expected to be able to be seen with binoculars in late May 2017 in the Northern Hemisphere, with a magnitude of 6 to 7, but the comet was fainter than predicted, reaching a magnitude of 7.1 on June 21.

The comet was characterised by its very low activity, resembling a manx comet. The comet showed no emission from C2, C3 and CN, which are part of the typical spectrum of  comet, when it was 2,83 AU from the Sun, but they were detected when the comet reached 2,3 AU from the Sun. The comet was observed by the SWAN instrument onboard SOHO and determined its water production near perihelion was 1029/s. Infrared spectroscopic observations indicated that the rotational temperature of the comet was warmer than predicted, indicating the presence of an icy grainy halo. The absolute nuclear magnitude was estimated to be 16.127 ± 0.176, indicating that the effective radius of the comet was 1,7 ± 0,138 km. The comet exhibited fan-shaped fine jets in the direction opposite of the Sun when imaged using polarimetry.

References 
 

Non-periodic comets
Comets in 2017